Sri Venkateswara Creations is an Indian film production company based in Hyderabad. It is established by Dil Raju in 2003. Raju has produced several Telugu films on this banner. The company also has a subsidiary film distribution business named 'Sri Venkateswara Film Distributors'.

Some of the notable films produced by the company include Dil (2003), Arya (2004), Bhadra (2005), Bommarillu (2006), Kotha Bangaru Lokam (2008), Brindavanam (2010), Mr. Perfect (2011), Seethamma Vakitlo Sirimalle Chettu (2013), Sathamanam Bhavati (2017), Fidaa (2017), F2 (2019), Maharshi (2019), and Sarileru Neekevvaru (2020). Eight directors debuted in Telugu cinema through Sri Venkateswara Creations  Sukumar, Boyapati Srinu, Bhaskar, Vamsi Paidipally, Srikanth Addala, Vasu Varma, Ravi Yadav, and Venu Sri Ram.

History 
Background

Raju and his brothers started film distribution in the early 1990s and partnered with Venkata Lakshmi Films. In 1996, they opened a new office with the name Sri Harshita Films. Most of the films that they distributed were unsuccessful at the box-office and they incurred heavy losses leading them to shut the company. After few more years studying the market, they established Sri Venkateswara Film Distributors in 1999. They chose to distribute films in the Nizam area which refers to the esrstwhile Hyderabad State and present-day Telangana. The first three films distributed were Oke Okkadu (1999), Nuvvu Vastavani (2000), and Sakhi (2000). They went on to distribute more films like Nuvvu Naaku Nachav (2001), Murari (2001), Kushi (2001), Aadi (2002), Athadu (2005), Chatrapati (2005), and Pokiri (2006).

Founding of Production company and success

After distributing films for four years, Raju, along with Giri, Sirish, and Lakshman, established Sri Venkateswara Creations production house in 2003. The first film that was made under the banner was Dil (2003), directed by V. V. Vinayak. After Dil, Giri has separated himself from the banner, while the rest continued. In 2004, they made Arya (2004) under the direction debut of Sukumar. In 2005, they made another successful film Bhadra, under the direction of Boyapati Srinu. In 2006, they produced Bommarillu under the direction of Bhaskar.

By the end of the year 2018, 40 films associated with the banner were released: out of which 30 films were produced by them, 6 were dubbed films, and 4 were collaborations. In an interview with Anil Ravipudi for GreatAndhra website, Dil Raju claimed that 22 of his 30 films (2003-2018) were either hits, super-hits, or classics; 4 were average grossers; and 4 films were flops.

In 2019, Sri Venkateswara Creations produced F2: Fun and Frustration which was released on the occasion of Sankranthi. The film became the highest grossing film for the banner and is one of the highest grossers of all time in Telugu cinema.

Film production

Solo Production

Collaborations with other producers

Involved in the production

Not involved in the production (but credited as a presenter)

Dil Raju Productions

Film distribution
This list is not complete and needs updating. This company and its predecessors have been distributing films in Nizam region, and occasionally Vizag region since 1999.

References

External links
 

Film production companies based in Hyderabad, India
Mass media companies established in 2003
Film distributors of India
Indian companies established in 2003
2003 establishments in Andhra Pradesh
Indian film studios